Fresh is the second studio album by Raspberries, released in 1972 (see 1972 in music).  It contained two Top 40 singles.  "I Wanna Be With You" reached number 16 on the Billboard Hot 100, number 10 on Cash Box and number 7 on Record World.  "Let's Pretend" reached number 35 on Billboard, number 18 on Cashbox, and number 14 on Record World.  It was their highest-charting album, peaking at number 36 on the Billboard album chart.

This album was re-released on CD as part of the Power Pop Vol. 1, also containing their first album Raspberries.

Record World called the single "Drivin' Around" a "Beach Boys-styled hot rod rocker."

Track listing
Timings and credits taken from the original Capitol issue (ST-11123).

Charts

Band members
Eric Carmen - rhythm guitar, lead and backing vocals, piano
Wally Bryson - lead guitar, backing and lead vocals
Dave Smalley - bass, backing and lead vocals
Jim Bonfanti - drums, backing vocals

Production
George Marino - mastering engineer

References

Bibliography

Raspberries (band) albums
1972 albums
Albums produced by Jimmy Ienner
Albums recorded at Record Plant (New York City)
Capitol Records albums